The Kings Point Handicap is an American Thoroughbred horse race held annually during the latter part of March (or February) at Aqueduct Racetrack in Jamaica, New York. Open to horses age three and older bred in the State of New York, it is contested on dirt over a distance of one and one eighth miles (9 furlongs).

Inaugurated in 1981, the race is named for the village of Kings Point, New York on the north shore of Long Island, New York which is home to the U.S. Merchant Marine Academy.

The Kings Point Handicap was run at a mile and seventy yards from 1981 to 1987, and from 1989 to 1995.  In 1988 it was run at one mile.

The race was run in two divisions in 2002.

In 2006, Kentucky Derby, Preakness Stakes and Jockey Club Gold Cup winner, Funny Cide won this race.

Records
Most wins:
 3 – Smart Coupons (1998, 1999, 2000)

Most wins by a jockey:
 3 – Ángel Cordero Jr. (1981, 1983, 1984)
 3 – John Velazquez (1994, 2001, 2004)

Most wins by a trainer:
 3 – Deborah S. Bodner (1998, 1999, 2000)

Most wins by an owner:
 2 – Arthur Wendel (1987, 1988)
 2 – Louis J. Porreco (1999, 2000)
 2 – Edwin H. Wachtel (2000) (2×)

Winners

References
 The 2010 Kings Point Handicap at the New York Thoroughbred Breeders website

Ungraded stakes races in the United States
Horse races in New York City
Aqueduct Racetrack
Recurring sporting events established in 1981
1981 establishments in New York City